Commodore Bruce Hamilton Loxton (31 March 1924 – 7 September 2006) was an Australian naval officer, naval historian, and Director-General of Naval Manpower in the Royal Australian Navy from 1975 until his retirement.

Early life
Loxton was born in Sydney and educated at Newington College (1933–1935) and The Scots College (1936).

Military education
At the age of 13, Loxton entered the Royal Australian Naval College (RANC) as one of only 16 candidates selected from 480 applicants. He graduated from RANC in 1941, and was made a Lieutenant in 1944. He later graduated from the Naval War College at Newport, Rhode Island (1960), and the Royal Naval Staff College, Greenwich, (1961).

HMAS Canberra
Loxton was 18 and a midshipman on the ship's bridge of  when it was sunk at the Battle of Savo Island. During the attack, a shell struck him and he was badly wounded. In all, 84 Australian personnel died on Canberra. On their return to Sydney, Rear Admiral Gerard Muirhead-Gould, the officer in charge of the Sydney naval area, told the crew of Canberra that they should feel ashamed that their ship had been sunk by gunfire without firing a shot in return. This annoyed Loxton for many years after the war, and he later set out to establish what had in fact happened. In 1994 he co-authored the book, Shame of Savo, analysing the strategy, operations, communications, tactics and command of the attack. He claimed that the American destroyer  inadvertently torpedoed Canberra, crippling her through friendly fire before she could fire a shot.

Military service
 Captain  1964–65
 Director of Naval Intelligence 1966–68
 Australian Naval Attaché, Washington 1968–71
 Director General Fighting Equipment, Navy office Canberra 1971–72
 Royal College of Defence Studies, London 1973
 Captain  1974

Books authored

Honours
 National Medal 1st Clasp – 1977 for diligent long service to the community in hazardous circumstances, including in times of emergency and national disaster, in direct protection of life and property.
 National Medal 2nd Clasp – 1978 for diligent long service to the community in hazardous circumstances, including in times of emergency and national disaster, in direct protection of life and property.

References

1924 births
2006 deaths
Graduates of the Royal Australian Naval College
People educated at Newington College
Australian naval historians
Australian military personnel of the Korean War
Royal Australian Navy personnel of World War II
Deaths from lung cancer
Royal Australian Navy officers
Deaths from cancer in New South Wales